Konar dam is the second of the four multi-purpose dams included in the first phase of the Damodar Valley Corporation. It was constructed across the Konar River, a tributary of the Damodar River in Hazaribagh district in the Indian state of Jharkhand and opened in 1955. The place has scenic beauty and has been developed as a recreational spot.

Geography

Location

The reservoir covers an area of 27.92 km2.

Note: The map alongside presents some of the notable locations in the district. All places marked in the map are linked in the larger full screen map.

DVC overview

As a result of the catastrophic flood of 1943, the Governor of Bengal appointed the Damodar Flood enquiry committee to suggest remedial measures. It suggested the creation of an authority similar to that of the Tennessee Valley Authority in the United States. W.L. Voorduin, senior engineer of TVA, prepared a preliminary report wherein he submitted an outline of a plan designed for achieving flood control, irrigation, power generation and navigation. As a result, Damodar Valley Corporation came into existence in 1948 for development and management of the basin as a whole. Voorduin envisaged the construction of eight dams and a barrage, but it was later decided to have only four dams, at Tilaiya, Konar, Maithon and Panchet, and Durgapur Barrage.

The first dam was built across the Barakar River at Tilaiya and inaugurated in 1953. The second dam across the Konar River was inaugurated in 1955. The third dam across the Barakar at Maithon was inaugurated in 1957. The fourth dam across the Damodar at Panchet was inaugurated in 1959.

Transport

References

External links

Dams in Jharkhand
Hazaribagh district
1955 establishments in Bihar
Dams completed in 1955
20th-century architecture in India